Ulrike Maisch (born January 21, 1977) is a long-distance runner from Germany, who won the women's marathon at the 2006 European Athletics Championships in Gothenburg, Sweden. Her children are Emil Friedrich and Paul Friedrich (both German) and her husband is also running and is called Richard Friedrich who won the Munich Marathon in 2011.

Biography
Maisch was born in Stralsund, Mecklenburg-Western Pomerania.

In 1996, she finished in 14th place in the women's 5000 metres at the 1996 World Junior Championships in Athletics held in Sydney, Australia.

She competed for her native country at the 2004 Summer Olympics in Athens, Greece. Maisch ran in the marathon at the 2009 World Championships in Athletics in Berlin, but dropped out due to a foot injury. She and Richard Friedrich (also a runner) had a child in early 2011 – Emil. Maisch said that becoming a mother did not mean the end of her running career, citing the example of Paula Radcliffe. Both Ulrik Maisch and Richard Friedrich now live in Guernsey and will compete for the nation, they will both be making their Guernsey debut at the 2016 Hampshire XC Championships.

Achievements
All results regarding marathon, unless stated otherwise

References

External links

1977 births
Living people
German female long-distance runners
German female marathon runners
Athletes (track and field) at the 2004 Summer Olympics
Olympic athletes of Germany
People from Stralsund
European Athletics Championships medalists
Sportspeople from Mecklenburg-Western Pomerania